San Gaetano may refer to:

 Saint Cajetan, Italian Catholic priest and religious reformer, co-founder of the Theatine
 San Gaetano, Brescia, church in Brescia, Italy
 San Gaetano, Florence, Baroque church in Florence, Italy
 San Gaetano, Padua, church in Padua, Italy
 San Gaetano, Vicenza, church in Padua, Italy
 San Gaetano alle Grotte, Catania, church in Vicenza, Italy
 San Gaetano alla Marina, Catania, Roman Catholic parish church in Catania, Italy
 San Gaetano di Thiene, Siena, church in Siena, Italy

See also
 Gaetano (disambiguation)